Anolis vanzolinii is a species of lizard in the family Dactyloidae (anoles). The species is endemic to Ecuador.

Etymology
The specific name, vanzolinii, is in honor of Brazilian herpetologist (and samba composer) Paulo Vanzolini.

Geographic range
A. vanzolinii is found in Sucumbíos Province, Ecuador.

Habitat

Reproduction
A. vanzolinii is oviparous.

References

Further reading
Nicholson KE, Crother BI, Guyer C, Savage JM (2012). "It is time for a new classification of anoles (Squamata: Dactyloidae)". Zootaxa 3477: 1–108. (Dactyloa vanzolinii, new combination, p. 83).
Williams EE, Orcés G, Matheus JC, Bleiweiss R (1996). "A New Giant Phenacosaur from Ecuador". Breviora (505): 1-32. (Phenacosaurus vanzolinii, new species).

Anoles
Lizards of South America
Endemic fauna of Ecuador
Reptiles of Ecuador
Taxa named by Ernest Edward Williams
Taxobox binomials not recognized by IUCN